A  microplate, also known as a microtiter plate (Microtiter is a registered trademark in the United States, therefore it should not be used generically without attribution), microwell plate or multiwell, is a flat plate with multiple "wells" used as small test tubes.  The microplate has become a standard tool in analytical research and clinical diagnostic testing laboratories.  A very common usage is in the enzyme-linked immunosorbent assay (ELISA), the basis of most modern medical diagnostic testing in humans and animals.

A microplate typically has 6, 12, 24, 48, 96, 384 or 1536 sample wells arranged in a 2:3 rectangular matrix. Some microplates have been manufactured with 3456 or 9600 wells, and an "array tape" product has been developed that provides a continuous strip of microplates embossed on a flexible plastic tape.

Each well of a microplate typically holds somewhere between tens of nanolitres to several millilitres of liquid. They can also be used to store dry powder or as racks to support glass tube inserts. Wells can be either circular or square. For compound storage applications, square wells with close fitting silicone cap-mats are preferred. Microplates can be stored at low temperatures for long periods, may be heated to increase the rate of solvent evaporation from their wells and can even be heat-sealed with foil or clear film. Microplates with an embedded layer of filter material were developed in the early 1980s by several companies, and today, there are microplates for just about every application in life science research which involves filtration, separation, optical detection, storage, reaction mixing, cell culture and detection of antimicrobial activity.

The enormous growth in studies of whole live cells has led to an entirely new range of microplate products which are "tissue culture treated" especially for this work. The surfaces of these products are modified using an oxygen plasma discharge to make their surfaces more hydrophilic so that it becomes easier for adherent cells to grow on the surface which would otherwise be strongly hydrophobic.

A number of companies have developed robots to specifically handle microplates. These robots may be liquid handlers which aspirate or dispense liquid samples from and to these plates, or "plate movers" which transport them between instruments, plate stackers which store microplates during these processes, plate hotels for longer-term storage, plate washers for processing plates, plate thermal sealers for applying heat seals, de-sealers for removing heat seals, or microplate incubators to ensure constant temperature during testing. Instrument companies have designed plate readers which can detect specific biological, chemical or physical events in samples stored in these plates. A specialized plate reader has also been developed which can perform quality control of microplate well contents, capable of identifying empty wells, filled wells and precipitate.

Manufacture and composition
Microplates are manufactured in a variety of materials. The most common is polystyrene, used for most optical detection microplates. It can be coloured white by the addition of titanium dioxide for optical absorbance or luminescence detection or black by the addition of carbon for fluorescent biological assays. Polypropylene is used for the construction of plates subject to wide changes in temperature, such as storage at −80 °C and thermal cycling. It has excellent properties for the long-term storage of novel chemical compounds. Polycarbonate is cheap and easy to mould and has been used for disposable microplates for the polymerase chain reaction (PCR) method of DNA amplification. Cyclo-olefins are now being used to provide microplates which transmit ultraviolet light for use in newly developed assays. There are also microplates constructed from solid pieces of glass and quartz for special applications.

The most common manufacturing process is injection molding, using materials such as polystyrene, polypropylene and cyclo-olefin for different temperature and chemical resistance needs. Glass is also a common material, and vacuum forming can be used with many other plastics such as polycarbonate. Composite microplates, filter bottom plates, solid phase extraction (SPE) plates, and even some advanced PCR plate designs use multiple components which are moulded separately and later assembled into a finished product. ELISA plates may now be assembled from twelve separate strips of eight wells, making it easier to only partially use a plate.

There are a multitude of formats, with the same footprint but different numbers of wells and heights.

The wells are available in different shapes:

 F-Bottom: flat bottom
 C-Bottom: bottom with minimal rounded edges
 V-Bottom: V-shaped bottom
 U-Bottom: U-shaped bottom
There are also deep well microplates sometimes called "blocks", as well as 192 and 768 well plates.

The standardization of the microwell plates is made by the Society for Biomolecular Sciences with the ANSI-Standards (ANSI/SBS 1-2004, ANSI/SBS 2-2004, ANSI/SBS 3-2004, ANSI/SBS 4-2004)

History

The earliest microplate was created in 1951 by a Hungarian, Dr. Gyula Takátsy, who machined six rows of 12 "wells" in Lucite.  However, common usage of the microplate began in the late 1980s when John Liner introduced a molded version. By 1990 there were more than 15 companies producing a wide range of microplates with different features. It was estimated that 125 million microplates were used in 2000 alone. The word "Microtiter" is a registered trademark of Thermo Electron OY (.) Since "Microtiter" is a registered trademark it should not be used as a generic term.

Other trade names for microplates include Viewplate and Unifilter (introduced in the early 1990s by Polyfiltronics and sold by Packard Instrument, which is now part of PerkinElmer).

In 1996, the Society for Biomolecular Screening (SBS), later known as Society for Biomolecular Sciences, began an initiative to create a standard definition of a microplate. A series of standards was proposed in 2003 and published by the American National Standards Institute (ANSI) on behalf of the SBS. The standards govern various characteristics of a microplate including well dimensions (e.g. diameter, spacing and depth) as well as plate properties (e.g. dimensions and rigidity) (standardized dimension 127.76 mm × 85.48 mm), which allows interoperability between microplates, instrumentation and equipment from different suppliers, and is particularly important in laboratory automation. In 2010, the Society for Biomolecular Sciences merged with the Association for Laboratory Automation (ALA) to form a new organisation, the Society for Laboratory Automation and Screening (SLAS). Henceforth, the microplate standards are known as ANSI/SLAS standards.

See also 
 Picotiter plate
 Nanotiter plate

References

External links 

  An article about the invention of the microplate, published in G.I.T. Laboratory Journal (accessed 06/10/10)
  Dr. Gyula Takátsy, at the Hungarian National Center of Epidemiology website (accessed 06/10/10)
  Official website publishing Microplate Standards

Laboratory equipment